The 2013 Champions League Twenty20 (CLT20) was the fifth edition of Champions League Twenty20, an international Twenty20 cricket tournament. It was held in India from 17 September to 6 October 2013.

Sydney Sixers were the defending champions but they failed to qualify for the event. During the finals on 6 October 2013, in a re-match of the opening game, the Mumbai Indians won their 2nd CLT20 title after bowling out the Rajasthan Royals, defeating them by 33 runs.

Background
Domestic Twenty20 competitions faced several setbacks in 2013. The Bangladesh Premier League included a spot-fixing scandal where seven individuals were charged. Their problems with franchises missing their payments to players also continued and resulted in five franchises having their contracts conditionally terminated. The Indian Premier League also included a spot-fixing case where three players were among the 39 charged.

This year's Sri Lanka Premier League was cancelled after all franchises refused to pay their bank guarantees. All franchises had lost interest in participating in the tournament after they all made losses from the inaugural season. As a replacement, Sri Lanka Cricket created the Super 4's Twenty20 and its four participating teams specifically for determining their representation in the CLT20. It was the first time where a team is neither a club nor a franchise and, as such, the first time where a cricketing board directly receives the proceeds from the CLT20.

In Australia, the Big Bash League continued to be a success and led to more public interest in cricket, especially amongst families. The Caribbean Premier League was created and had its first season in August 2013. Billed as the "ultimate cricket carnival", its major attraction was its unique party atmosphere and it was an immediate success with high attendance for all matches. Another attraction was the involvement of legends of West Indies cricket in coaching roles and Hollywood stars taking equity interests in the teams. The Big Bash League introduced to the game the Zing wicket system, with LED lights on the stumps and bails that light up at almost the instant the wicket is broken, and the umpire cam, a camera attached to the caps worn by the umpires. Both features were also used in the Caribbean Premier League.

Format
The tournament features a qualifying stage and group stage. The qualifying stage consists of four teams playing a round-robin tournament from which the top two teams qualify for the group stage. These two teams join the eight teams that received direct entry in the group stage. The group stage has the teams divided into two groups of five teams and each group plays a round-robin tournament. The top two teams of each group advances to the knockout stage. The knockout stage consists of two semi-finals, with the top team of one group facing the second from the other. The winners of the semi-finals play the grand final to determine the winners of the competition. Matches ending with the scores level are decided by a Super Over, where the winners of the Super Over are declared winners of the match.

Points awarded in the qualifying and group stages:

Prize money
The winners of champions league got 1.5 million US dollars while the runners up got 1 million.

Qualification
England teams have indefinitely refused participation in the tournament starting with this edition due to its dates clashing with the end of the County Championship. England teams had previously missed the 2010 edition due to similar scheduling problems. Contrary to the previous two seasons, Trinidad and Tobago received direct qualification on account of their good past performances. They were also chosen ahead of the winners of the newly created Caribbean Premier League. This edition was the second to feature a team from Pakistan and the first for editions held in India. The strained ties between the Indo-Pak governments and establishments had been the primary reason for Pakistan's exclusion before 2012. The winners of the Sri Lanka Premier League were originally scheduled to participate in the qualifying stage before the tournament was cancelled.

Teams
Due to the tournament format restricting player contracts from the 2011–12 (first) season to only be for that season, all teams of the Big Bash League underwent many changes to their squads. New contracts, however, could be multi-year agreements. The Sydney Sixers, winners of the 2012 edition, failed to qualify. Pakistan sent a team.

Squads

This edition saw the first instance of a player choosing his home team over his IPL team after qualifying with both. Of the 12 players named in the preliminary squads of more than one team, Kumar Sangakkara chose to play for the Kandurata Maroons instead of the Sunrisers Hyderabad from the IPL. In doing so, Sangakkara, per his contract, forfeited 20% of his IPL salary ($140,000). Sri Lanka Cricket would not receive the $150,000 compensation they would have otherwise received for not having Sangakkara. The decision came after long discussions between the two parties. The issue also raised questions of loyalty and money amongst the public. Sangakkara criticised SLC for how the affair was presented as such, saying "I am the one who suffers" regardless of his choice.

Qualifying stage

Fixtures

Group stage

Group A

Fixtures

Group B

Fixtures

Knockout stage

Fixtures
Semi-finals

Final

Final standings

Statistics

Most runs
The following are the top five highest run scorers in the main tournament.

Source : Golden Bat

Most wickets
The following are the five leading wicket-takers of the main tournament.

Source : Golden Wicket

References

External links
 Tournament website on ESPN Cricinfo

2013
Champions League Twenty20
Champions League Twenty20